Mid and West Wales is an electoral region of the Senedd, consisting of eight constituencies. The region elects twelve members, eight directly elected constituency members and four additional members.  The electoral region was first used in the 1999 Welsh Assembly election, when the National Assembly for Wales was created.

Each constituency elects one Member of the Senedd by the first past the post electoral system, and the region as a whole elects four additional or top-up Members of the Senedd, to create a degree of proportional representation. The additional member seats are allocated from closed lists by the D'Hondt method, with constituency results being taken into account in the allocation.

County and Westminster boundaries

As created in 1999, the region covered the whole of the preserved county of Dyfed, most of the preserved county of Powys and parts of the preserved counties of Clwyd and Gwynedd. Other parts of Powys, Clwyd and Gwynedd were within the North Wales electoral region.

However, boundaries changed for the 2007 Welsh Assembly election and the region now covers all of the preserved county of Dyfed, all of the preserved county of Powys and part of the preserved county of Gwynedd. The rest of Gwynedd is in the North Wales region.

The constituencies have the names and boundaries of constituencies of the House of Commons of the Parliament of the United Kingdom (Westminster). For Westminster election purposes, however, there are no electoral regions, and constituency boundary changes became effective for the 2010 United Kingdom general election.

Electoral region profile
The region is geographically the largest of the five electoral regions in Wales, being larger in area than the other four regions combined. It consists almost entirely of sparsely populated rural areas, with the exception of the tinplate- and steel-producing town of Llanelli in the south. The Welsh language is widely spoken.

Constituencies

Assembly members and Members of the Senedd

Constituency MSs

Regional list MSs
N.B. This table is for presentation purposes only

2021 Senedd election

2021 Senedd election additional members

Regional MSs elected 2021

D'Hondt count

2016 Welsh Assembly election additional members

Regional AMs elected 2016

2011 Welsh Assembly election additional members

Regional AMs elected 2011

2007 Welsh Assembly election additional members

Regional AMs elected 2007

2003 Welsh Assembly election additional members

Regional AMs elected 2003

1999 Welsh Assembly election additional members

Regional AMs elected 1999

Former constituencies

1999 to 2007

Notes

Senedd electoral regions